Feversham may refer to:

 Baron Feversham, a title that has been created twice
 Earl of Feversham
 HMS Feversham, a 32-gun fifth rate warship
 Feversham Girls' Academy, an Islamic school for girls in Bradford, England
 Feversham, a community in Grey Highlands, Ontario, Canada

See also

 Faversham